Upper Denby is a small village within the civil parish of Denby Dale, and the borough of Kirklees in West Yorkshire, England.

The southern edge of the village is bordered by the Metropolitan borough of Barnsley within the county of South Yorkshire.

The village
It has a pub (The George Inn), a dentist, a church (St John the Evangelist) and cricket ground. (The Denby Cricket Club are in the Huddersfield Cricket League) 

Upper Denby is home to Denby C of E first school.

In the 2001 census the population was given as 719 and included the settlement of High Flatts. By the 2011 census, this had dropped to a population of 715.

See also
Listed buildings in Denby Dale

References

External links

Villages in West Yorkshire
Denby Dale